Apolipoprotein E (Apo-E) is a protein involved in the metabolism of fats in the body of mammals. A subtype is implicated in the Alzheimer's disease and cardiovascular diseases. It is encoded in humans by the gene APOE.

Apo-E belongs to a family of fat-binding proteins called apolipoproteins.  In the circulation, it is present as part of several classes of lipoprotein particles, including chylomicron remnants, VLDL, IDL, and some HDL. APOE interacts significantly with the low-density lipoprotein receptor (LDLR), which is essential for the normal processing (catabolism) of triglyceride-rich lipoproteins. In peripheral tissues, APOE is primarily produced by the liver and macrophages, and mediates cholesterol metabolism. In the central nervous system, Apo-E is mainly produced by astrocytes and transports cholesterol to neurons via APOE receptors, which are members of the low density lipoprotein receptor gene family. Apo-E is the principal cholesterol carrier in the brain. Apo-E is required for cholesterol transportation from astrocytes to neurons. APOE qualifies as a checkpoint inhibitor of the classical complement pathway by complex formation with activated C1q.

Evolution

Apolipoproteins are not unique to mammals. Many terrestrial and marine vertebrates have versions of them.  It is believed that APOE arose via gene duplications of APOC1 before the fish-tetrapod split c. 400 million years ago. Proteins similar in function have been found in choanoflagellates, suggesting that they are a very old class of proteins predating the dawn of all living animals.

The three major human alleles (E4, E3, E2) arose after the primate-human split around 7.5 million years ago.  These alleles are the by-product of non-synonymous mutations which led to changes in functionality.  The first allele to emerge was E4. After the primate-human split, there were four amino acid changes in the human lineage, three of which had no effect on protein function (V174L, A18T, A135V). The fourth substitution (T61R) traded a threonine for an arginine altering the protein's functionality. This substitution occurred somewhere in the 6 million year gap between the primate-human split and the Denisovan-human split, since exactly the same substitutions were found in Denisovan APOE.

About 220,000 years ago, a cysteine to arginine substitution took place at amino acid 112 (Cys112Arg) of the APOE4 gene, and this resulted in the E3 allele. Finally, 80,000 years ago, another arginine to cysteine substitution at amino acid 158 (Arg158Cys) of the APOE3 gene created the E2 allele.

Structure

Gene

The gene, APOE, is mapped to chromosome 19 in a cluster with apolipoprotein C1 (APOC1) and the apolipoprotein C2 (APOC2). The APOE gene consists of four exons and three introns, totaling 3597 base pairs. APOE is transcriptionally activated by the liver X receptor (an important regulator of cholesterol, fatty acid, and glucose homeostasis) and peroxisome proliferator-activated receptor γ, nuclear receptors that form heterodimers with retinoid X receptors. In melanocytic cells APOE gene expression may be regulated by MITF.

Protein
APOE is 299 amino acids long and contains multiple amphipathic α-helices. According to crystallography studies, a hinge region connects the N- and C-terminal regions of the protein. The N-terminal region (residues 1–167) forms an anti-parallel four-helix bundle such that the non-polar sides face inside the protein. Meanwhile, the C-terminal domain (residues 206–299) contains three α-helices which form a large exposed hydrophobic surface and interact with those in the N-terminal helix bundle domain through hydrogen bonds and salt-bridges. The C-terminal region also contains a low density lipoprotein receptor (LDLR)-binding site.

Polymorphisms

APOE is polymorphic, with three major alleles (epsilon 2, epsilon 3, and epsilon 4): APOE-ε2 (cys112, cys158), APOE-ε3 (cys112, arg158), and APOE-ε4 (arg112, arg158). Although these allelic forms differ from each other by only one or two amino acids at positions 112 and 158, these differences alter APOE structure and function. 

There are several low-frequency polymorphisms of APOE. APOE5 comes in two subtypes E5f and E5s, based on migration rates. APOE5 E5f and APOE7 combined were found in 2.8% of Japanese males. APOE7 is a mutation of APOE3 with two lysine residues replacing glutamic acid residues at positions 244 and 245.

Much remains to be learned about the APOE isoforms, including the interaction of other protective genes. Indeed, the apolipoprotein ε4 isoform is more protective against cognitive decline than other isoforms in some cases, so caution is advised before making determinant statements about the influence of APOE polymorphisms on cognition, development of Alzheimer's disease, cardiovascular disease, telomere shortening, etc. Many of the studies cited that purport these adverse outcomes are from single studies that have not been replicated and the research is based on unchecked assumptions about this isoform. As of 2007, there was no evidence that APOE polymorphisms influence cognition in younger age groups (other than possible increased episodic memory ability and neural efficiency in younger APOE4 age groups), nor that the APOE4 isoform places individuals at increased risk for any infectious disease.

However, the association between the APOE4 allele and Alzheimer's disease has been shown to be weaker in minority groups differently compared to their caucasian counterparts. Hispanics/Latinos and African Americans who were homozygous for the APOE4 allele had 2.2 and 5.7 times the odds, respectively of developing Alzheimer's disease. Caucasians who were homozygous for the allele had 12.5 times the odds.

Function 
APOE transports lipids, fat-soluble vitamins, and cholesterol into the lymph system and then into the blood. It is synthesized principally in the liver, but has also been found in other tissues such as the brain, kidneys, and spleen. In the nervous system, non-neuronal cell types, most notably astroglia and microglia, are the primary producers of APOE, while neurons preferentially express the receptors for APOE. There are seven currently identified mammalian receptors for APOE which belong to the evolutionarily conserved LDLR family.

APOE was initially recognized for its importance in lipoprotein metabolism and cardiovascular disease. Defects in APOE result in familial dysbetalipoproteinemia aka type III hyperlipoproteinemia (HLP III), in which increased plasma cholesterol and triglycerides are the consequence of impaired clearance of chylomicron, VLDL and LDL. More recently, it has been studied for its role in several biological processes not directly related to lipoprotein transport, including Alzheimer's disease (AD), immunoregulation, and cognition. Though the exact mechanisms remain to be elucidated, isoform 4 of APOE, encoded by an APOE allele, has been associated with increased calcium ion levels and apoptosis following mechanical injury.

In the field of immune regulation, a growing number of studies point to APOE's interaction with many immunological processes, including suppressing T cell proliferation, macrophage functioning regulation, lipid antigen presentation facilitation (by CD1) to natural killer T cell as well as modulation of inflammation and oxidation. APOE is produced by macrophages and APOE secretion has been shown to be restricted to classical monocytes in PBMC, and the secretion of APOE by monocytes is down regulated by inflammatory cytokines and upregulated by TGF-beta.

Clinical significance

Alzheimer's disease

As of 2012, the E4 variant was the largest known genetic risk factor for late-onset sporadic Alzheimer's disease (AD) in a variety of ethnic groups. However, the E4 variant does not correlate with risk in every population. Nigerian people have the highest observed frequency of the APOE4 allele in world populations, but AD is rare among them. This may be due to their low cholesterol levels. Caucasian and Japanese carriers of two E4 alleles have between 10 and 30 times the risk of developing AD by 75 years of age, as compared to those not carrying any E4 alleles. This may be caused by an interaction with amyloid. Alzheimer's disease is characterized by build-ups of aggregates of the peptide beta-amyloid. Apolipoprotein E enhances proteolytic break-down of this peptide, both within and between cells. The isoform APOE-ε4 is not as effective as the others at promoting these reactions, resulting in increased vulnerability to AD in individuals with that gene variation.

Recently, the amyloid hypothesis of Alzheimer's disease has been questioned, and an article in Science claimed that "Just as removing smoke does not extinguish a fire, reducing amyloid plaques may not affect the course of Alzheimer's disease." The role that the E4 variant carries can still be fully explained even in the absence of a valid amyloid hypothesis given the fact that reelin signaling emerges to be one of the key processes involved in Alzheimer's disease and the E4 variant is shown to interact with ApoER2, one of the neuronal reelin receptors, thereby obstructing reelin signaling.

Although 40–65% of AD patients have at least one copy of the ε4 allele, APOE4 is not a determinant of the disease. At least one-third of patients with AD are APOE4 negative and some APOE4 homozygotes never develop the disease. Yet those with two ε4 alleles have up to 20 times the risk of developing AD. There is also evidence that the APOE2 allele may serve a protective role in AD. Thus, the genotype most at risk for Alzheimer's disease and at an earlier age is APOE4,4.  Using genotype APOE3,3 as a benchmark (with the persons who have this genotype regarded as having a risk level of 1.0) and for white populations only, individuals with genotype APOE4,4 have an odds ratio of 14.9 of developing Alzheimer's disease. Individuals with the APOE3,4 genotype face an odds ratio of 3.2, and people with a copy of the 2 allele and the 4 allele (APOE2,4), have an odds ratio of 2.6.  Persons with one copy each of the 2 allele and the 3 allele (APOE2,3) have an odds ratio of 0.6. Persons with two copies of the 2 allele (APOE2,2) also have an odds ratio of 0.6.

While ApoE4 has been found to greatly increase the odds that an individual will develop Alzheimer's, a 2002 study concluded, that in persons with any combination of APOE alleles, high serum total cholesterol and high blood pressure in mid-life are independent risk factors which together can nearly triple the risk that the individual will later develop AD. Projecting from their data, some researchers have suggested that lowering serum cholesterol levels may reduce a person's risk for Alzheimer's disease, even if they have two ApoE4 alleles, thus reducing the risk from nine or ten times the odds of getting AD down to just two times the odds.

Women are more likely to develop AD than men across most ages and APOE genotypes. Premorbid women with the ε4 allele have significantly more neurological dysfunction than men.

Atherosclerosis
Knockout mice that lack the apolipoprotein-E gene (APOE−/−) develop extreme hypercholesterolemia when fed a high-fat diet.

Malaria

APOE−/− knockout mice show marked attenuation of cerebral malaria and increased survival, as well as decreased sequestration of parasites and T cells within the brain, likely due to protection of the blood–brain barrier. Human studies have shown that the APOE2 polymorphism correlates with earlier infection, and APOE3/4 polymorphisms increase likelihood of severe malaria.

Interactions

Interactive pathway map

References

Further reading

External links 
 
 apoe4.info – website for APOE-epsilon-4 carriers
 
 

Apolipoproteins
Alzheimer's disease